Extra virgin may refer to:

 Extra virgin, a grade of olive oil acidity, sometimes incorrectly used to describe other kinds of oil.

Entertainment
Extra Virgin, TV cooking series for Cooking Channel with Debi Mazar
Extra Virgin, Off West End Theatre Award nomination Freddie Hogan
Extra Virgin, Thai distributor of Enemies of the People (film)
Extra Virgin (album), a 1996 album by Olive
Extra Virgin (band), Rogers Stevens
Extra Virgin Orchestra, Helen Bowater